Hotel Senator or Senator Hotel may refer to:

Canada
 Hotel Senator (Saskatoon)

United States
 Senator (Atlantic City hotel)
 Senator Hotel, in Sacramento, California